Timms Hill or Timm's Hill is the highest natural point in the U.S. state of Wisconsin and is located in north-central Wisconsin in Timms Hill County Park in the Town of Hill in Price County.

Description 
Timms Hill is located in Timms Hill County Park. A public lookout tower is atop the hill. Visible to the southeast is Rib Mountain (elev. 1,924 ft, 586 m), 44 miles away by line of sight.

See also
List of U.S. states by elevation

References

External links
 
 
 
 

Hills of Wisconsin
Landmarks in Wisconsin
Landforms of Price County, Wisconsin
Highest points of U.S. states